Acanthostichus is a predatory and predominantly subterranean genus of ant in the subfamily Dorylinae. They are found in the New World, from the southern United States to Uruguay, Paraguay and northern Argentina. They are probably common, but due to their subterranean nature, they are seldom collected or seen.

Most species are very similar; the petiole is the most important feature in identifying species. Many are known only from a few collections, or even single specimen, which makes it hard to determine variability within species. For this reason, many described members of this genus may be synonyms.

Species
The genus currently contains 24 species:

Acanthostichus arizonensis MacKay, 1996
Acanthostichus bentoni MacKay, 1996
Acanthostichus brevicornis Emery, 1894
Acanthostichus brevinodis MacKay, 1996
Acanthostichus concavinodis MacKay, 1996
Acanthostichus davisi (Smith, 1942)
Acanthostichus emmae MacKay, 1996
Acanthostichus femoralis Kusnezov, 1962
Acanthostichus flexuosus MacKay, 1996
Acanthostichus fuscipennis Emery, 1895
†Acanthostichus hispaniolicus De Andrade, 1998
Acanthostichus kirbyi Emery, 1895
Acanthostichus laevigatus MacKay, 1996
Acanthostichus laticornis Forel, 1908
Acanthostichus lattkei MacKay, 1996
Acanthostichus longinodis Mackay, 2004
Acanthostichus punctiscapus MacKay, 1996
Acanthostichus quadratus Emery, 1895
Acanthostichus quirozi MacKay, 1996
Acanthostichus sanchezorum MacKay, 1985
Acanthostichus serratulus (Smith, 1858)
Acanthostichus skwarrae Wheeler, 1934
Acanthostichus texanus Forel, 1904
Acanthostichus truncatus MacKay, 1996

References

External links

Dorylinae
Ant genera
Hymenoptera of South America
Hymenoptera of North America